Chamestan District is a district (bakhsh) in Nur County, Mazandaran Province, Iran. At the 2006 census, its population was 40,683, in 10,217 families.  The District has one city: Chamestan. The District has three rural districts (dehestan): Lavij Rural District, Mianrud Rural District, and Natel-e Restaq Rural District.

References 

Nur County
Districts of Mazandaran Province